Lucrezia Reichlin  (born 14 August 1954) is an Italian economist who has been a professor at London Business School since 2008.

Early life and education
Reichlin was born in 1954, she is the daughter of Alfredo Reichlin, former deputy of the Italian Communist Party and its heir the Democratic Party of the Left, and of Luciana Castellina, co-founder of the newspaper Il manifesto and also a one-time deputy; her brother Pietro Reichlin is a well-known economist.

After completing high school at the Liceo Tasso in Rome, Reichlin graduated in economics at the University of Modena and Reggio Emilia in 1980, and then got a Ph.D. at New York University in 1986.

Career
Reichlin's research focuses on forecasting, business cycle analysis and monetary policy. She pioneered now-casting in economics by developing econometrics methods capable of reading the real time data flow through the lenses of a formal econometric model. These methods are now widely used by central banks and private investors around the world.

From 1994 until 2005, Reichlin was a professor of economics at the Université libre de Bruxelles.

From 2005 to 2008, Reichlin served as Director General of Research at the European Central Bank in Frankfurt, under the leadership of President Jean-Claude Trichet; she was the first woman in that role. Since 2008 she has been professor of economics at London Business School. In 2014, she was mentioned in international news media as a potential candidate to succeed Mark Carney as Governor of the Bank of England or Fabrizio Saccomanni as Minister of Economy and Finance in the government of Prime Minister Matteo Renzi.

Since 2014, Reichlin has been a regular contributor to Project Syndicate.

In early 2021, Reichlin was appointed by the G20 to the High Level Independent Panel (HLIP) on financing the global commons for pandemic preparedness and response, co-chaired by Ngozi Okonjo-Iweala, Tharman Shanmugaratnam and Lawrence Summers.

Other activities (selection)

Corporate boards
 Ageas, Non-Executive Member of the Board of Directors 
 Eurobank Ergasias, Non-Executive Member of the Board of Directors
 Banca Carige, Non-Executive Member of the Board of Directors (2018)
 UniCredit, Member of the Board of Directors (2009–2018)

Non-profit organizations
 European Corporate Governance Institute (ECGI), Chair of the Board of Directors (since 2020)
 IFRS Foundation, Member of the Board of Trustees
 Centre for Economic Policy Research (CEPR), Member of the Board of Trustees
 Center for Applied Financial Economics (CAFE), University of Southern California, Member of the Advisory Board
 Bruegel, Chair of the Scientific Council (2013–2016)

Recognition
 2013 – Fellow of the British Academy (FBA) 
 2016 – Birgit Grodal Award
 2021 – Serena Medal, British Academy

References

External links
 Personal website

1954 births
Living people
21st-century  Italian  economists
20th-century  Italian economists
Italian women economists
New York University alumni
Fellows of the British Academy
Fellows of the Econometric Society
Academics of London Business School